Aq Manar (also Romanized as Āq Manār and Āqmanār) is a village in Gavdul-e Sharqi Rural District of the Central District of Malekan County, East Azerbaijan province, Iran. At the 2006 National Census, its population was 1,461 in 328 households. The following census in 2011 counted 1,669 people in 382 households. The latest census in 2016 showed a population of 1,573 people in 514 households; it was the largest village in its rural district.

References 

Malekan County

Populated places in East Azerbaijan Province

Populated places in Malekan County